Rehri or Rehri Goth (Urdu: ریڑھی), is a 300-year-old site, is a neighborhood in the Malir District of Karachi, Pakistan. It was previously a part of Bin Qasim Town, which was disbanded in 2011. Rehri is located on the Arabian Sea coast and has a large community of fishermen.

There are several ethnic groups in Bin Qasim Town including Urdu speakers, Punjabis, Sindhis, Kashmiris, Seraikis, Pakhtuns,  Balochs, Memons, Bohras, Ismailis. Over 99% of the population is Muslim. The population of Bin Qasim Town is estimated to be nearly one million.

References

External links 
 Karachi Website.

Neighbourhoods of Karachi
Archaeological sites in Sindh
Bin Qasim Town